The following are the scheduled events of association football (soccer) for the year 2020 throughout the world.

Numerous association football competitions were either postponed or cancelled during the year due to the ongoing COVID-19 pandemic. On 13 March 2020, FIFA announced that clubs did not have to release players to their national teams during the international windows of March and April 2020, while players also had the option to decline a call-up without any consequences. FIFA also recommended that all international matches during the March and April 2020 windows be postponed.

By April 2020 only four nations were still playing association football league matches: Belarus, Nicaragua, Tajikistan, and Turkmenistan

In April 2020, FIFA announced that the 2020 FIFA U-20 Women's World Cup and the 2020 FIFA U-17 Women's World Cup would be postponed and rescheduled.

Events

Men's Youth
 8–26 January: 2020 AFC U-23 Championship in 
 : 
 : 
 : 
 4th: 
 17 February – 5 March: 2020 Arab Cup U-20 in 
 : 
 : 
 19–29 November: 2020 COSAFA Under-17 Championship in 
 : 
 : 
 : 
 4th: 
 20–29 November: 2020 WAFU U-20 Tournament in 
 : 
 : 
 22 November – 2 December: 2020 CECAFA U-20 Championship in 
 : 
 : 
 : 
 4th: 
 3–13 December: 2020 COSAFA U-20 Cup in 
 : 
 : 
 : 
 4th: 
 13–28 December: 2020 UNAF U-20 Tournament in 
 : 
 : 
 : 
 15–23 December: 2020 UNIFFAC U-20 Championship in

Women's national teams

 4–10 March: 2020 Turkish Women's Cup in 
 : 
 : 
 : 
 4th: 
4–11 March: 2020 Algarve Cup in 
 : 
 : 
 : 
 4th:

CAF
 3–14 November: 2020 COSAFA Women's Championship in 
: 
:

Women's Youth
 22 February – 8 March: 2020 CONCACAF Women's U-20 Championship in 
 : 
 : 
 4–14 November: 2020 COSAFA U-17 Women's Championship in 
: 
:

Men's clubs

UEFA
 17 September 2019 – 25 August 2020: 2019–20 UEFA Youth League (final in  Nyon)
 :  Real Madrid
 :  Benfica

News 
 29 January – In each team's opening match of CONCACAF Olympic qualifying, Christine Sinclair scored two goals in Canada's 11–0 win over Saint Kitts and Nevis. Her second goal was the 185th of her international career, giving her sole possession of the record for international goals (for either men or women) previously held by the USA's Abby Wambach.
 13 March – FIFA announced that clubs did not have to release players to their national teams during the international windows of March and April 2020 due to the COVID-19 pandemic, players also had the option to decline a call-up without any consequences.
 3 April – FIFA announces that the 2020 FIFA U-20 Women's World Cup, scheduled to be held in Panama and Costa Rica in August, and the 2020 FIFA U-17 Women's World Cup, scheduled to be held in India in November, would be postponed and rescheduled.
 20 April – Due to the COVID-19 pandemic, only four top-tier football leagues were actively playing as of this date: 2020 Ýokary Liga, 2020 Tajikistan Higher League, Belarusian Premier League and Liga Primera de Nicaragua.

Club continental champions

Men

Women

National leagues

UEFA

AFC

CAF

CONCACAF

CONMEBOL

OFC

Non-FIFA

Domestic cups

UEFA

AFC

CAF

CONCACAF

CONMEBOL

OFC

Non-FIFA

Women's leagues

UEFA

AFC

CAF

CONCACAF

CONMEBOL

OFC

Women's domestic cups

UEFA

AFC

CAF

CONCACAF

CONMEBOL

OFC

Deaths
5 January
 Hans Tilkowski, German football goalkeeper and manager (b. 1935)
 6 January – Luís Morais, Brazilian football player (b. 1930)
 7 January
 Khamis Al-Dosari, Saudi Arabian footballer (b. 1973)
 17 January – Pietro Anastasi, Italian footballer (b. 1948)
 21 January – Theodor Wagner, Austrian footballer and manager (b. 1927)
 24 January – Juan José Pizzuti, Argentine footballer and manager (b. 1927)
 29 January – Keith Nelson, New Zealand footballer (b. 1947)
 16 February – Harry Gregg, Northern Irish footballer (b. 1932)
 18 March – Joaquín Peiró, Spanish football player (b. 1936)
 19 March – Peter Whittingham, English footballer (b. 1984)
26 March – Michel Hidalgo, French footballer and manager (b. 1933)
 12 April – Peter Bonetti, English footballer (b. 1941)
 28 April – Michael Robinson, English-Irish footballer and TV commentator (b. 1958)
 28 June – Marián Čišovský, Slovak footballer (b. 1979)
 21 August – Pedro Nájera, Mexican footballer (b. 1929)
21 August – Hammadi Agrebi, Tunisian footballer (b. 1951)
8 September – Alfred Riedl, Austrian football player and manager (b. 1949)
17 September – Ricardo Ciciliano, Colombian footballer (b. 1976)
22 September – Agne Simonsson, Swedish footballer and manager (b. 1935)
12 October – Carlton Chapman, Indian footballer (b. 1971)
20 October – Bruno Martini, French footballer (b. 1962)
30 October – Nobby Stiles, English footballer and manager (b. 1942)
15 November – Ray Clemence, English football goalkeeper (b. 1948)
21 November – Ricky Yacobi, Indonesian footballer (b. 1963)
25 November – Diego Maradona, Argentine footballer player and manager (b. 1960 )
29 November – Papa Bouba Diop, Senegalese footballer (b. 1978)
9 December – Paolo Rossi, Italian footballer (b. 1956)
14 December – Gérard Houllier, French football manager (b. 1947)
31 December – Tommy Docherty, Scottish footballer and manager (b. 1928)

References

External links 

 
Association football by year